, also known as , is a girls' junior and senior high school (7th - 12th grades), authorized by the Japanese Education Law, of Religious Society of Friends in Mita, Minato, Tokyo, Japan.

In 1887, Women Evangelical Friends from Philadelphia, Pennsylvania, USA founded it for the purpose of education for women on the advice of Uchimura Kanzō and Nitobe Inazō. The School is still the only Friends' educational organization in Japan. Whilst all the pupils are not Friends, they receive education about Quakerism including about Inner light.

The School states that the characters used to transliterate 'Friend' in Japanese mean "universal connection with all global places".  This is derived from an idea of Tsuda Sen, who was the father of Tsuda Umeko, the founder of Tsuda College.

Notable alumni
Marie Kondo

External links

Friends School (Japan) in Japanese & English
 English language map showing both the Friends School and the Friends Meeting with respect to a train station

Quaker schools
Educational institutions established in 1887
Christian schools in Japan
1887 establishments in Japan
Minato, Tokyo